Hiromitsu (written: 博光, 博満, 宏光, 宏充, 弘光, 広光, 洋光 or 洋充) is a masculine Japanese given name. Notable people with the name include:

, Japanese shamisen player
Hiromitsu "Hiro-x" Aoki, J-pop musical artist
, Japanese footballer
, Japanese footballer
, Japanese baseball player
, Japanese martial artist
, Japanese shogi player
, Japanese sumo wrestler
, Japanese idol, singer and actor
, Japanese boxer and mixed martial artist
, Japanese baseball player and manager
, Japanese printmaker, often known simply as Hiromitsu
, Japanese sumo wrestler

Japanese masculine given names